Sol e Mar Stroesner Sales de Jesus (born ) is a Brazilian futsal player who plays as a winger for Marreco and the Brazilian national futsal team.

References

External links
Liga Nacional de Futsal profile
The Final Ball profile

1988 births
Living people
Brazilian men's futsal players
People from São Luís, Maranhão
Sportspeople from Maranhão